Qufu South railway station is a railway station in Qufu, Jining, Shandong, China. Opened on 26 December 2021, it is an intermediate stop on the west–east Rizhao–Lankao high-speed railway. The nearby Qufu East railway station is an intermediate stop on the north–south Beijing–Shanghai high-speed railway. The two stations are connected via a chord.

The station has two side platforms.

References

Railway stations in Shandong
Railway stations in China opened in 2021